Zirc is a town in Veszprém county, Hungary. It is the administrative seat of Zirc District.

At the end of the 19th century and the beginning of the 20th century, Jews lived in Zirc. In 1910, 92 Jews lived in Zirc, Some of them were murdered in the Holocaust.

Attractions
Zirc Abbey, a Cistercian abbey
Bakony Museum of Natural Sciences, situated in the territory of Zirc Abbey
Reguly Antal Memorial Library
Zirc Arboretum
Reguly Antal Ethnographic Museum and Folk Art Workshop

Twin towns – sister cities

Zirc is twinned with:
 Pohlheim, Germany (1990)
 Baraolt, Romania (1990)
 Nivala, Finland (1998)
 Dertsen, Ukraine (2009)

References

External links
Aerial photography: Zirc

Populated places in Zirc District
Hungarian German communities

Jewish communities destroyed in the Holocaust